This article contains a list of fossil-bearing stratigraphic units in the state of Nebraska, U.S.

Sites

See also

 Paleontology in Nebraska

References

 

Nebraska
Stratigraphic units
Stratigraphy of Nebraska
Nebraska geography-related lists
United States geology-related lists